The São Paulo ePrix is a race of the single-seater, electrically powered Formula E championship, set to be held for the first time in São Paulo, Brazil in March 25, 2023.

History
Back in the first season, there were plans for a Rio de Janeiro ePrix, but it didn't happen due to technical issues. Years later Lucas di Grassi planned a circuit at Ibirapuera Park, but political changes made it impossible. In the third time there were plans to bring the FE during the 2017-2018 season, but an agreement was only reached in 2022. The agreement was reached between the São Paulo City Hall and the FE on April 30, 2022. The contract has a 5-year term, with the possibility of extending it to another 5 years. The contract was approved and the calendar was confirmed by FIA on June 29, 2022 and was made official on October 13, 2022.

The track will have  length and will use a good part of the original IndyCar circuit.

Results

Interview

Notes

References 

Formula E ePrix
Recurring sporting events established in 2023
2023 establishments in Brazil